The 2015 St. Louis Attack season was the third season for the 
indoor football franchise, and their second in the X-League Indoor Football.

On April 23, 2015, it was announced that Head Coach Chris McKinney had been fired, and Pat Pimmel would be the Attack's interim head coach.

Schedule
Key:

Regular season
All start times are local to home team

Standings

 z-Indicates best regular season record
 x-Indicates clinched playoff berth

Roster

References

River City Raiders seasons
St. Louis Attack
St. Louis Attack